Bean Creek is a stream in Audrain County in the U.S. state of Missouri. It is a tributary of the Salt River.

Bean Creek has the name of an early settler.

See also
List of rivers of Missouri

References

Rivers of Audrain County, Missouri
Rivers of Missouri